Kapil Deo Kamat (11 May 1951 – 16 October 2020) was an Indian politician from Madhubani district of Bihar, India. He was serving as Minister of Panchayati Raj Department, Government of Bihar. He was a Member of Bihar Legislative Assembly representing Babubarhi (Vidhan Sabha constituency).

Early life 
Kapil Deo Kamat was born on 11 May 1951, at Madhubani district in Bihar, India as a son of Late Anokhi Kamat.

Political career 
Kapil contested the October 2005 Bihar Legislative Assembly election as a Janta Dal United candidate from Babubarhi (Vidhan Sabha constituency) and won. Again, he contested the 2010 Bihar Legislative Assembly election from the same constituency but lost to Uma Kant Yadav of Rashtriya Janata Dal. In 2015 Bihar Legislative Assembly election he won from the Babubarhi (Vidhan Sabha constituency) and was appointed Minister of Panchayati Raj Department, Government of Bihar.

Death
Kamat died from COVID-19 during the COVID-19 pandemic in India.

References

External links 

State cabinet ministers of Bihar
Janata Dal (United) politicians
Bihar MLAs 2005–2010
Bihar MLAs 2015–2020
1951 births
2020 deaths
Deaths from the COVID-19 pandemic in India
People from Madhubani district